Fahd Al Hayyan (born March 22, 1971) is a Saudi Arabian actor, who started his acting career in 1991. He is mostly known for his various roles in the Saudi comedy Ghashamsham and Tash ma Tash.

Acting works 
Tash ma Tash (for several years)
Ghashamsham During Ramadan (2006-2011)

References

External links 
http://www.alriyadh.com/2007/02/01/article221244.html
http://www.alriyadh.com/2010/03/16/article506877.html
http://moh-alzela3e.com/vb/showthread.php?t=22032

1971 births
Living people
Saudi Arabian male television actors
People from Riyadh